The 2019–20 Minnesota Wild season was the 20th season for the National Hockey League franchise that was established on June 25, 1997.

The season was suspended by the league officials on March 12, 2020, after several other professional and collegiate sports organizations followed suit as a result of the ongoing COVID-19 pandemic. On May 26, the NHL regular season was officially declared over with the remaining games being cancelled. The Wild returned to the playoffs after missing them in the 2018–19 season and faced the Vancouver Canucks in the qualifying round, losing in four games.

Standings

Divisional standings

Western Conference

Tiebreaking procedures
 Fewer number of games played (only used during regular season).
 Greater number of regulation wins (denoted by RW).
 Greater number of wins in regulation and overtime (excluding shootout wins; denoted by ROW).
 Greater number of total wins (including shootouts).
 Greater number of points earned in head-to-head play; if teams played an uneven number of head-to-head games, the result of the first game on the home ice of the team with the extra home game is discarded.
 Greater goal differential (difference between goals for and goals against).
 Greater number of goals scored (denoted by GF).

Schedule and results

Preseason
The preseason schedule was published on June 13, 2019.

Regular season
The regular season schedule was published on June 25, 2019.

Playoffs 

The Wild were defeated by the Vancouver Canucks in the qualifying round in four games.

Player statistics

Skaters

Goaltenders

†Denotes player spent time with another team before joining the Wild. Stats reflect time with the Wild only.
‡Denotes player was traded mid-season. Stats reflect time with the Wild only.
Bold/italics denotes franchise record.

References

Minnesota Wild seasons
Minnesota Wild
Minnesota Wild
Minnesota Wild